Emmalocera platymochla is a species of snout moth in the genus Emmalocera. It was described by Alfred Jefferis Turner in 1947 and is found in Australia.

References

Moths described in 1947
Emmalocera